George Stanley Wilson (1879-1958) was an American architect and builder based in Riverside, California.

Wilson was born in Bournemouth, England in 1879.  He came to Riverside, California in 1895 at age 16, with his family.

He was buried in Evergreen Cemetery, Riverside's first cemetery.

A number of his works are listed on the U.S. National Register of Historic Places for their architecture.

Works include:
Arlington Branch Library and Fire Hall (1927-28 renovation), Riverside, NRHP-listed
United States Post Office (Redlands, California), 201 Brookside Ave., Riverside, NRHP-listed
Riverside Municipal Auditorium and Soldier's Memorial Building, 3485 7th St., Riverside, NRHP-listed 
Riverside-Arlington Heights Fruit Exchange, 3391 7th St., Riverside, NRHP-listed
M. H. Simon's Undertaking Chapel, 3610 11th St., Riverside, NRHP-listed
Corona High School, 815 W. 6th St., Corona, California, NRHP-listed
Fullerton City Hall (1939-42), 237 W. Commonwealth Ave., Fullerton, California, NRHP-listed
Lake Norconian Club, junction of Fifth and Western Ave., Norco, California, NRHP-listed
The Mission Inn, 3649 Mission Inn Ave, Riverside, California, NRHP-listed

References

1879 births
1958 deaths
People from Bournemouth
People from Riverside, California
English emigrants to the United States
Architects from California